Neocalyptis lacernata is a species of moth of the family Tortricidae. It is found in Japan.

The wingspan is about 16 mm.

References

	

Moths described in 1975
Neocalyptis